In Our Nature is a 2012 film starring John Slattery, Gabrielle Union, Jena Malone, and Zach Gilford, and directed by Brian Savelson. It premiered at the SXSW Film Festival and was released in theaters by Cinedigm. Seth and Andie had the perfect weekend getaway planned, until an unexpected visit puts Seth's estranged father and his girlfriend in the same cabin.

References

2012 drama films
2012 films
American drama films
2010s English-language films
2010s American films

External links 
 

2010 drama films
American drama films
Films about vacationing